Father Henry Cyril Dieckhoff (1869-1950) was a Russian Catholic priest and linguist. He was born in Moscow, the son of a Lutheran preacher, but spent much of his youth in Germany, as his mother was Catholic and unable to continue living in Russia. He studied in Berlin and was given Holy Orders without permission from the Russian authorities and therefore first fled to England and then Scotland, where he was welcomed as a brother at the Fort Augustus Abbey in 1891. He gained priesthood six years laters in 1897.

He learnt Scottish Gaelic and did detailed research into the dialect of Glengarry and published a dictionary on the dialects, A Pronouncing Dictionary of Scottish Gaelic. His dictionary was unusual for the time as it included detailed pronunciation information not only on the citation forms but also inflected forms of the entries.

References

Scottish Gaelic language
1869 births
1950 deaths
19th-century Roman Catholic priests from the Russian Empire
Linguists from Russia